The 2013 IIHF Inline Hockey World Championship was the 18th IIHF Inline Hockey World Championship, an international inline hockey tournament run by the International Ice Hockey Federation. The World Championship ran alongside the 2013 IIHF Inline Hockey World Championship Division I tournament and took place between 2 and 8 June 2013 in Dresden, Germany. The tournament was won by the United States, earning their sixth World Championship title. Sweden finished in second place and Canada in third after defeating Slovakia in the bronze medal match. Slovenia after losing their placement round game and finishing last in the standings was relegated to Division I for 2014.

Qualification
Seven of the eight teams automatically qualified for the 2013 IIHF Inline Hockey World Championship while the eighth spot was awarded to the winner of the 2012 IIHF InLine Hockey World Championship Division I tournament. The 2012 Division I tournament was won by Slovakia who defeated Hungary in the final to earn promotion back to the World Championship after they were relegated in 2011.

 − Finished first in the 2012 World Championship
 − Finished sixth in the 2012 World Championship
 − Finished third in the 2012 World Championship
 − Finished second in the 2012 World Championship
 − Finished fourth in the 2012 World Championship
 − Winner of 2012 IIHF InLine Hockey World Championship Division I
 − Finished seventh in the 2012 World Championship
 − Finished fifth in the 2012 World Championship

Seeding and groups
The seeding in the preliminary round was based on the final standings at the 2012 IIHF InLine Hockey World Championship and 2012 IIHF InLine Hockey World Championship Division I. The World Championships groups are named Group A and Group B while the 2013 IIHF Inline Hockey World Championship Division I tournament use Group C and Group D, as both tournaments were held in Dresden, Germany. The teams were grouped accordingly by seeding at the previous year's tournament (in parenthesis is the corresponding seeding):

Group C
 (1)
 (4)
 (5)
 (8)

Group D
 (2)
 (3)
 (6)
 (7)

Preliminary round
Eight participating teams were placed in the following two groups. After playing a round-robin, every team advanced to the Playoff round.

All times are local (UTC+2).

Group A

Group B

Playoff round
All eight teams advanced into the playoff round and were seeded into the quarterfinals according to their result in the preliminary round. The winning quarterfinalists advanced through to the semifinals, while the losing teams moved through to the placement round. Slovenia was relegated after losing the final placement round game against Finland, while the Czech Republic finished fifth after defeating Slovenia and Germany finished sixth following their win over Finland. In the semifinals Sweden defeated Canada and the United States beat Slovakia, both advancing to the gold medal game. After losing the semifinals Canada and Slovakia played off for the bronze medal with Canada winning 5–1. The United States defeated Sweden 6–3 in the gold medal game, earning their sixth World Championship title.

All times are local (UTC+2).

Quarterfinals

Placement round

Relegation game

Semifinals

Bronze medal game

Gold medal game

Ranking and statistics

Tournament Awards
Best players selected by the directorate:
Best Goalkeeper:  Brett Leggat
Best Defenseman:  Daniel Brolin
Best Forward:  Travis Noe

Final standings
The final standings of the tournament according to IIHF:

Scoring leaders
List shows the top skaters sorted by points, then goals. If the list exceeds 10 skaters because of a tie in points, all of the tied skaters are shown.

Leading goaltenders
Only the top five goaltenders, based on save percentage, who have played at least 40% of their team's minutes are included in this list.

References

External links

World Championship at IIHF.com

IIHF Inline Hockey World Championship
2013 in inline hockey
IIHF InLine Hockey World Championship
IIHF InLine Hockey World Championship
Sport in Dresden
Inline hockey in Germany